Coignet may refer to:
 Edmond Coignet (1856–1915), a French engineer and entrepreneur
 François Coignet (1814–1888), a French industrialist
 Gillis Coignet (c.1542–1599), a Dutch and Flemish painter
 Gillis II Coignet (1586–after 1641), a Flemish painter
 Horace Coignet (1735–1821), a French composer
 Jean Francisque Coignet (1835–1902), a French mining engineer and government advisor in Bakumatsu and Meiji period Japan
 Jean-Roch Coignet (1776–1865), a French soldier
 Jules Coignet (1798–1860), a French landscape painter
 Matthieu Coignet (c. 1514–1586), a French lawyer, ambassador, landowner, and author
 Michiel Coignet (1549–1623), a Flemish engineer, cosmographer, mathematician and manufacturer of scientific instruments
 Michiel II Coignet (1618–c.1663), a Flemish painter